Allan Enzo Cruz Leal (born 24 February 1996) is a Costa Rican professional footballer who plays as a midfielder for the Costa Rica national team.

Club career

Uruguay de Coronado
Born in Nicoya, in the province of Guanacaste, Cruz began his career with then Primera División club Uruguay de Coronado. On 29 August 2015, Cruz made his professional debut for the club in their 2–0 victory against Saprissa. Prior to his debut, Cruz spent a short period on loan with Generación Saprissa.

On 7 November, Cruz scored his first competitive goal for Uruguay de Coronado in the 11th minute of a 2–1 defeat against Santos de Guápiles.

Herediano
Prior to the 2017–18 season, Cruz joined Herediano. He made his debut during the club's first game of the season on 29 July 2017 against Guadalupe. He was a starter as Herediano drew the match 0–0. His first goal for the side came on 20 January 2018 against Saprissa in a 1–0 home victory. He ended his first season with Herediano having played in 46 matches and scoring 3 goals.

On 20 February 2018, Cruz made his CONCACAF Champions League debut in Herediano's 2–2 draw against Tigres UANL. The next season, Cruz helped Herediano reach the final of the CONCACAF League, scoring in the first leg of the final against Honduran club Motagua in a 2–0 victory. He then started the in the second leg on 1 November as Herediano lost 2–1 but won 3–2 on aggregate.

In December 2018, Cruz helped Herediano win the 2018 Apertura. He started for the club in the second leg of the final against Saprissa as Herediano drew the match 2–2 and won on aggregate 5–4.

FC Cincinnati
On 18 January 2019, it was announced that Cruz had signed with Major League Soccer club FC Cincinnati prior to their inaugural season. He made his debut for the club on 10 March 2019, starting in their 1–1 away draw against Atlanta United. Cruz then scored his first goal for FC Cincinnati in their next match against the Portland Timbers. His 61st-minute goal was the second in a 3–0 victory at Nippert Stadium. Cruz ended his first season with FC Cincinnati with 7 goals in 22 matches.

On 1 March 2020, Cruz scored FC Cincinnati's first goal of the 2020 season against the New York Red Bulls, however the club lost the match 3–2.

On October 24, 2022, it was announced that Cruz was departing FC Cincinnati following the end of the 2022 season.

International career
In September 2018, Cruz was called into the Costa Rica squad which would take on South Korea and Japan in international friendlies. He started for Costa Rica as they lost 2–0 on 7 September 2018. On 20 November 2018, Cruz scored his first ever goal for his country in their 3–2 victory over Peru at the Estadio de la UNSA.

On 5 June 2019, Cruz was included in Gustavo Matosas' squad for the 2019 CONCACAF Gold Cup. He scored Costa Rica's third goal in their opening 3–0 victory against Nicaragua.

Career statistics

Club

International

Honours
Herediano
Primera División: 2018 Apertura
CONCACAF League: 2018

References

External links
 Profile at FC Cincinnati

1996 births
Living people
People from Guanacaste Province
Costa Rican footballers
Association football midfielders
C.S. Herediano footballers
FC Cincinnati players
Major League Soccer players
Costa Rica international footballers
Designated Players (MLS)
Expatriate soccer players in the United States
Costa Rican expatriate sportspeople in the United States
2019 CONCACAF Gold Cup players
2021 CONCACAF Gold Cup players